Jean Pliya (July 21, 1931 – May 14, 2015) was a Beninese playwright and short story writer.

Life 
Born in what was then Dahomey, Pliya was educated at the University of Dakar and then the University of Toulouse. He graduated from the second in 1957 and in 1959 returned to his homeland to teach. He went on to hold ministerial positions in the Benin government.

Work 
His work often considers colonial history and issues of values. He has also attempted to translate the Fon people's tales for a French speaking audience.

Publications 
 L'Arbre fétiche, recueil de nouvelles (L'Arbre fétiche, La Voiture rouge, L'homme qui avait tout donné, le Gardien de nuit), Yaoundé, Éditions CLE, 1971
 Kondo le requin, consacré au roi Behanzin, Yaoundé, CLE, 1981 (Grand prix littéraire d'Afrique noire)
 Les Chimpanzés amoureux, Le Rendez-vous, La Palabre de la dernière chance, nouvelles, les Classiques africains, 1977
 La Secrétaire particulière, Yaoundé, Éditions CLE, 1973
 Les Tresseurs de cordes, Paris, Hatier, Abidjan, CEDA, 1987
 La Fille têtue, contes et récits traditionnels du Bénin, Abidjan ; Dakar ; Lomé, Nouvelles Éditions africaines, 1982.

References

External links
 Official site

Beninese dramatists and playwrights
1931 births
People from Djougou
Cheikh Anta Diop University alumni
Beninese male short story writers
Beninese short story writers
Beninese translators
University of Toulouse alumni
20th-century dramatists and playwrights
Government ministers of Benin
20th-century translators
2015 deaths
20th-century short story writers
20th-century male writers
20th-century Beninese writers